The artistic gymnastics competition of the Mayagüez 2010 Central American and Caribbean Games was held 25–30 July 2010 at the Hormigueros Gymnastics Pavilion in Hormigueros, Puerto Rico.



Medal summary

Men's events

Women's events

See also 
 Rhythmic gymnastics at the 2010 Central American and Caribbean Games
 Trampoline at the 2010 Central American and Caribbean Games

References

External links 
  

Events at the 2010 Central American and Caribbean Games
Central American and Caribbean Games Artistic gymnastics
2010 Artistic